Ritual II is a public art work by Russian-American artist Alexander Liberman located at the Lynden Sculpture Garden near Milwaukee, Wisconsin. The sculpture is an abstract form; it is installed on the lawn.

Description
The sculpture consists of a black monolith set on a circular base. Near the shaft's base is a circular form.

See also
Argo
Axeltree
Orbits

References

1966 sculptures
Steel sculptures in Wisconsin
Sculptures by Alexander Liberman
Abstract sculptures in Wisconsin
1966 establishments in Wisconsin